The Sulawesian puddle frog or Celebes Oriental frog (Occidozyga celebensis) is a species of frog in the family Dicroglossidae. It is endemic to Sulawesi, Indonesia.

This abundant species lives in paddy fields and other disturbed habitats. It breeds in paddy fields and slow-moving streams. As a widespread, abundant and adaptable species, it is not threatened.

References

Occidozyga
Endemic fauna of Indonesia
Amphibians of Sulawesi
Taxa named by Malcolm Arthur Smith
Amphibians described in 1927
Frogs of Asia
Taxonomy articles created by Polbot